TIROS-1 (or TIROS-A) was the first full-scale weather satellite (the Vanguard 2 satellite was the first experimental/prototype weather satellite), the first of a series of Television Infrared Observation Satellites placed in low Earth orbit.

Program 

The TIROS Program was NASA's first experimental step to determine if satellites could be useful in the study of the Earth. At that time, the effectiveness of satellite observations was still unproven. Since satellites were a new technology, the TIROS Program also tested various design issues for spacecraft: instruments, data and operational parameters. The goal was to improve satellite applications for Earth-bound decisions, such as "should we evacuate the coast because of the hurricane?".

The TIROS-1 Program's first priority was the development of a meteorological satellite information system. Weather forecasting was deemed the most promising application of space-based observations.

Spacecraft 

Spacecraft power was supplied by approximately 9000 - by  silicon solar cells mounted on the cover assembly and by 21 nickel-cadmium batteries. A single monopole antenna for reception of ground commands extended out from the top of the cover assembly. A pair of crossed-dipole antennas (235 MHz) for transmission projected down and diagonally out from the baseplate. Mounted around the edge of the baseplate were five diametrically opposed pairs of small, solid-fuel thrusters that maintained the satellite spin rate between 8 and 12 rpm. The satellite was equipped with two -diameter vidicon TV cameras, one wide angle and one narrow angle, for taking earth cloud cover pictures. The pictures were transmitted directly to a ground receiving station or were stored in a tape recorder on board for later playback, depending on whether the satellite was within or beyond the communication range of the station. The satellite was spin-stabilized.

Mission 

Launched into orbit from Cape Canaveral Space Launch Complex 17A on 1 Apr 1960 at 11:40:09 UTC by a Thor Able II rocket, the satellite performed normally from launch until June 15, 1960, when an electrical power failure prevented further useful TV transmission.

Over its -month lifespan, TIROS 1 returned 23,000 photos of the Earth, 19,000 of them usable for weather analysis. For the first time, it was possible to view large scale cloud patterns in their totality, and from this, identify storm regions. The satellite provided the first long-term observations of a developing storm from orbit, tracking the disintegration of a large cyclonic mass off the coast of Bermuda over the course of four days. In addition, TIROS 1 returned data on smaller scale structures such as tornadoes and jet streams, and findings returned from the satellite complemented and enhanced ground-based findings.

TIROS 1 remains in orbit as of November 2020.

See also
 First images of Earth from space

References

External links
Track the current position of TIROS 1
TIROS – NASA Science
Final Report on the TIROS I Meteorological Satellite System
The Smithsonian National Air and Space Museum Exhibition List 
TIROS 1 & 2 Ground Control Canter at Camp Evans - preserved by InfoAge Science History Center
Published story of how the first TIROS photo was flown by helicopter, then a jet from the Camp Evans Ground Control Center to NASA
TIROS I is Launched - NOAASIS 
TIROS-1 50th Anniversary & Resources on Satellite Meteorology
NASA's YouTube video of TIROS-1

Spacecraft launched in 1960
Weather satellites of the United States
Weather imaging satellites
Satellites in low Earth orbit